Thomas L. Steffen (July 9, 1930 – September 1, 2020) was a justice of the Supreme Court of Nevada from 1982 to 1997, serving as chief justice from 1995 to 1997. He graduated with honors from George Washington University Law School in 1964, where he began his career as a contract negotiator for the Bureau of Naval Weapons. After retirement from the Supreme Court in 1997, he practiced law with the Hutchison & Steffen law firm.

Steffen was born in Tremonton, Utah and went to Bear Creek High School.

References

1930 births
2020 deaths
George Washington University Law School alumni
Nevada lawyers
People from Tremonton, Utah
Military personnel from Utah
Justices of the Nevada Supreme Court
United States Navy civilians
Chief Justices of the Nevada Supreme Court